Joakim Sveder Bang (15 December 1868 – 2 February 1931) was a Norwegian physician and politician.

He was born in Årstad to engineer Joackim Waldemar Bang and Hanna Hermansen. He graduated as cand.med. in 1894, and further specilazed in surgery. He was also a military officer. 
He participated with the Red Cross during the Balkan Wars (1912–1913), and in British hospitals during the First World War. He was elected representative to the Storting for the periods 1922–1924 and 1925–1927, for the Free-minded Liberal Party.

References

1868 births
1931 deaths
Physicians from Bergen
Norwegian military doctors
Norwegian Army personnel
Free-minded Liberal Party politicians
20th-century Norwegian politicians
Members of the Storting
Norwegian surgeons
Sportspeople from Bergen